Mouzinho is a surname. Notable people with the surname include:

João Mouzinho de Albuquerque (1797–1881), Portuguese writer and administrator
João Pedro Mouzinho de Albuquerque (1736–1802), Portuguese nobleman
Joaquim Augusto Mouzinho de Albuquerque (1855–1902), Portuguese soldier
José Mouzinho (born 1885), Portuguese horse rider
Cidália Lopes Nobre Mouzinho Guterres, first lady of East Timor
Luís da Silva Mouzinho de Albuquerque (1792–1846), Portuguese military officer, engineer, poet, scientist and politician
Mouzinho (footballer) (born 2002), East Timorese footballer